Food Unwrapped is a British television series broadcast by Channel 4 featuring Jimmy Doherty, Kate Quilton, Matt Tebbutt, Helen Lawal, Amanda Byram, Andi Oliver, Briony May Williams and John Whaite. The show is based on the original Dutch series "Food CIA", devised by Dahl TV and licensed by Warner Bros. International Television Production Ltd. There have been 23 series and a number of special episodes.

Presented as a consumer show investigating food production, it was first broadcast on 10 September 2012.

Series overview

Series

Note: Series 19 was due to premiere on 9 April 2021, but was postponed until 16 April 2021 due to the death of his HRH Prince Philip, Duke of Edinburgh.

Specials

References

External links
 
 Food Unwrapped on Channel 4

2012 British television series debuts
2010s British documentary television series
2020s British documentary television series
Channel 4 documentary series
English-language television shows
Food and drink in the United Kingdom
Food and drink television series
Documentary television series about industry
Manufacturing in the United Kingdom
Television series by Warner Bros. Television Studios
Works about the food industry